Banglar Bodhu (English: The Bengali Bride) is a 1993 Bangladeshi film starring Alamgir and Shabana opposite him. A. J. Mintu garnered Bangladesh National Film Award for Best Director.

Synopsis
A newly married woman struggles to getting acquaintance with her in-law's house members and become the apple of the eye of the family.

Cast 
 Shabana
 Alamgir
 Omar Sunny

Soundtrack
All songs were composed by Alam Khan and written by Moniruzzaman Monir

"Ke Sui Hoye Ghore Dhoke" - Andrew Kishore, Sabina Yasmin and Khurshid Alam 
"Oi Meyeti Keno Eto Sundori" - Andrew Kishore 
"Ektu Ektu Kore Kachhe Esechhi" - Andrew Kishore, Runa Laila 
"Tumi Ami Dujon Jadur Baksho" - Baby Naznin, Khurshid Alam
"Shonibare Robibare Shombare" - Andrew Kishore, Runa Laila

Awards 
Bangladesh National Film Awards
Best Director - A. J. Mintu

References

1993 films
Bengali-language Bangladeshi films
1990s Bengali-language films
Films whose writer won the Best Screenplay National Film Award (Bangladesh)
Films directed by A J Mintu
Films scored by Alam Khan